Lobster Man from Mars is a 1989 comedy film directed by Stanley Sheff and starring Tony Curtis. The film is a spoof of B movie sci-fi films from the 1950s. It had its world premiere at the Sundance Film Festival in 1989.

Plot
Young filmmaker Stevie Horowitz eagerly awaits a meeting with big shot Hollywood film producer J.P. Shelldrake. Shelldrake has been desperately searching for a way to avoid problems with the IRS and unpaid millions owed them in back taxes. His brilliant yet overpaid accountant devises a scheme to allow the producer to write off the expenses of his next movie release, but only if the film is a box office flop. Armed with his foolproof plan, Shelldrake agrees to meet with Stevie and screen his film "Lobster Man from Mars" (financed by Stevie's jailed con man Uncle Joey). The plot resembles the premise of The Producers (1968) by Mel Brooks.

Inside Shelldrake's private screening room, the film within the film begins. They watch the weird plot unfold: Mars suffers from a severe air leakage. The King of Mars commands the dreaded Lobster Man and his assistant Mombo, a gorilla wearing a space helmet, to pilot his flying saucer to Earth then steal its air. Once landed, the Lobster Man wastes no time transforming hapless victims into smoking skeletons.

On a lonely road, John and Mary, a young and innocent couple discovers the hiding place of the flying saucer in a dark and mysterious cave. They attempt to warn the authorities but are ignored. Successfully contacting Professor Plocostomos, a plan is created to lure the Lobster Man to Mr. Throckmorton's Haunted House that just happens to be surrounded by boiling hot springs.

Once lured, it is simply a matter of pushing the Lobster Man into the hot water where he will be boiled to death. The plan is interrupted by Colonel Ankrum and his troops. The house is shelled and destroyed, the Lobster Man flees to his cave, taking Mary with him. She manages to escape, but the Lobster Man follows. A wild chase ensues, but Professor Plocostomos uses the hot engine coolant from his overheated vehicle to drench Mombo causing his foamy demise. The chase concludes in Yellowstone National Park where the dreaded Lobster Man is tricked into walking into the Old Faithful Geyser and a steamy demise.

The screening is over. Shelldrake cannot believe his good fortune to witness such a bad movie with potential to lose every cent invested in its distribution and promotion. He buys the production on the spot, but once in release it becomes a huge success and makes a huge profit sending Shelldrake straight to tax prison, with Stevie taking his place as the studio's new boy wonder.

Cast
 Tony Curtis as J.P. Shelldrake
 Patrick Macnee as Professor Plocostomos
 Deborah Foreman as Mary
 Billy Barty as Mr. Throckmorton
 Anthony Hickox as John
 Fred Holliday as Colonel Ankrum
 Dr. Demento as The Narrator
 S. D. Nemeth as Dreaded Lobster Man
 Tommy Sledge as Himself
 M. G. Kelly as Dick Strange
 Phil Proctor as Lou
 Bobby Pickett as King of Mars / Astrologer
 Steve Peterson as The Butler
 William Ackerman as Gas Station Attendant
 Tim Haldeman as Marvin
 Jim Bentley as Rufus
 Skip Young as Mr. Zip
 Dean Jacobson as Stevie Horowitz
 Mindy Kennedy as Tammy
 Stanley Sheff as Space Bat / Brainex (voices)

Awards and nominations
Sundance Film Festival
 1989: Grand Jury Prize – (nominated)

See also 
 Robot Monster

External links 
 
 
 
 

1989 films
1989 comedy films
1989 independent films
1980s parody films
1980s science fiction comedy films
American independent films
American parody films
American science fiction comedy films
Mars in film
1980s English-language films
1980s American films
Films set in the Yellowstone National Park
Alien invasions in films